House of the Blues is an album by blues musician John Lee Hooker, compiling tracks originally released as singles between 1951 and 1952, that was released by the Chess label in 1959.

Reception
AllMusic reviewer Bill Dahl stated: "This 1959 Chess album collects 1951–1954 efforts by John Lee Hooker. Some important titles here."

Track listing
All compositions credited to John Lee Hooker
 "Walkin' the Boogie" 	3:08
 "Love Blues" – 3:00
 "Union Station Blues" – 2:31
 "It's My Own Fault" – 2:22
 "Leave My Wife Alone" – 2:34
 "Ramblin' By Myself" – 2:41
 "Sugar Mama" – 2:30
 "Down at the Landing" – 3:10
 "Louise" – 2:35
 "Ground Hog Blues" – 2:25
 "High Priced Woman" – 3:15
 "Women and Money" – 2:55
Recorded in Chicago on April 26, 1951 (tracks 3, 5, 6 & 9-11), and in Detroit on April 24, 1952 (tracks 1, 2, 7 & 8) and mid/late 1952 (tracks 4 & 12)

Personnel
John Lee Hooker – guitar, vocals
Eddie Kirkland – guitar (tracks 9, 11 & 12)
Bob Thurman – piano (tracks 4 & 12)
Eddie Burns - bass (tracks 4 & 12)
Tom Whitehead – drums (track 12)

References

John Lee Hooker albums
1959 albums
albums produced by Leonard Chess
Chess Records albums